Chelonomima is a genus of flies in the family Stratiomyidae.

Species
Chelonomima gracilis James, 1949
Chelonomima partiticeps Enderlein, 1914
Chelonomima proloxocera Speiser, 1922
Chelonomima signata Meijere, 1924

References

Stratiomyidae
Brachycera genera
Taxa named by Günther Enderlein
Diptera of Africa